The M110 Semi Automatic Sniper System (M110 SASS) is an American semi-automatic precision rifle that is chambered for the 7.62×51mm NATO round. It is manufactured by Knight's Armament Company, developed from the Knight's Armament Company SR-25, and adopted by the U.S. military following the 2005 US Army Semi-Automatic Sniper Rifle (XM110 SASR) competition. The M110 was to be replaced by the lighter and more compact M110A1 CSASS, which is developed from the G28, a variant of the Heckler & Koch HK417, however, most M110A1 models fielded have been of the SDMR variant. In 2021, a newer variant, the M110A2, was showcased and seen in use in early 2022.

Overview

The M110 Semi-Automatic Sniper System is intended to replace the M24 Sniper Weapon System used by snipers, spotters, designated marksmen, or squad advanced marksmen in the United States Army. However, the U.S. Army still acquired M24s from Remington until February 2010. After witnessing the effects of USSOCOM snipers and extensive after-action reports from SOF snipers throughout the Iraqi theater of operations, the U.S. Army ran a competition involving several designs, including rifles from Knight's Armament Company, Remington, and DPMS Panther Arms. On September 28, 2005, the Knight's Armament Co. rifle won the competition and was selected to be the supplier of the M110 Semi-Automatic Sniper System. The XM110 underwent final operational testing in May and June of 2007 at Fort Drum, New York by a mix of Special Forces troops and Sniper trained soldiers from the 10th Mountain Division. In April 2008, U.S. Army soldiers from Task Force Fury in Afghanistan were the first in a combat zone to receive the M110. The troops rated the weapon very highly, noting the quality of the weapon and its semi-automatic capabilities compared to the bolt-action M24. The United States Marine Corps will also be adopting the M110 to replace some M39 and all Mk 11 as a complement to the M40A5. It is manufactured by Knight's Armament Company in Titusville, Florida, though the complete system incorporates a Leupold 3.5–10× variable power daytime optic, Harris swivel bipod, AN/PVS-26 or AN/PVS-10 night sight and PALs magazine pouches of yet unpublished origin. The rifle has ambidextrous features such as a double-sided magazine release, safety selector switch, and bolt catch.

Design and features
The rifle is similar to the SR-25/Mk 11 Mod 0, but differs significantly in buttstock and rail system design. The SR-25, Mk 11 Mod 0, and M110 are based loosely on the original AR-10 developed by Eugene Stoner but feature additional refinements instituted by KAC to maximize parts commonality with the AR-15 design, improve weapon reliability, and increase accuracy.

The main differences between the Mk 11 and M110 are improvements suggested by a user group meeting between NAVSPECWAR, USASOC and USA in 2007:
 The rail system used: the KAC Free Floated RAS on the Mk 11 is replaced by a URX modular rail system with integral folding front 600-meter backup iron sight.
 The M110 buttstock: fixed, though the buttplate is adjustable for length of pull to match user preferences. Adjustment can be made without tools via a notched hand-tightened knob on the right-hand side of the stock. This feature was added during the change from XM110 to M110. The fixed buttstock also features integral quick-detachable sling swivel sockets located on each side of the stock near the rear of the lower receiver.
 The addition of a flash hider to the barrel of the M110, which also necessitates a modified QD Suppressor unit similar to that on the Mk 11.
 The M110's use of KAC's one-piece 30 mm scope mount instead of two separate scope rings.

On June 12, 2008, the M110 was ranked #2 on the U.S. Army's top ten inventions of 2007.
According to performance specification (MIL-PRF-32316 (AR) w/AMENDMENT 1, 5 October 2009):

3.4.1.1.1 Accuracy. The distance between the mean point of impact of each shot group, both unsuppressed and suppressed, shall be not greater than 1.1 inches at 300 feet. 
3.4.1.1.2 Dispersion. The average mean radius (AMR) (see 6.11), of each shot group shall be not greater than to 0.68 inches at 300 feet. All targets shall be fired on using M118LR ammunition or equivalent, using five (5) round groups.

Sporting use
In 2009, the M110 rifle and commercial equivalents were added to the list of NFA-legal US service rifles under rule 3.1.6 of the NRA High Power Rifle Rules.

Replacement or reconfiguration of M110
In April 2011, according to Military.com, the U.S. Army issued a request to the private sector to reconfigure or replace the current Knight Armament M110 sniper rifle, alleging that the current version of the M110 was not functioning well in the field and, according to industry officials and users in the field, required significant maintenance and replacement of parts.  The U.S. Army responded directly, claiming that the rifle was functioning perfectly, citing a 100% approval rating from the 173rd Airborne Brigade, and they were simply looking for a smaller, lighter version of M110 for the spotter in a sniper team.

The specifications the U.S. Army has issued are as follows:

 Operation: Semi-automatic
 Caliber: Compatible with 7.62×51mm NATO cartridges
 Accuracy: Capable of 1.3 minute of angle dispersion or better with match ammunition
 Size: Overall length shall be reduced using a shorter barrel and/or collapsible buttstock. Maximum length not to exceed 39 without suppressor. Desired minimum length is less than 36 with stock collapsed.
 Weight: Weight shall be under 9.0 lb for unloaded rifle without optics and accessories
 Grip: A modular, adjustable pistol grip.
 Trigger: A non-adjustable match style trigger.
 Hand guard: A forend that includes a fixed 12 o’ clock rail with configurable 3, 6, and 9 o’ clock rails.
 Sound suppressor: A muzzle mounted, detachable sound suppressor.
 Muzzle device: A compensator/muzzle brake compatible with the sound suppressor.
 Bipod: Tool-less detachment featuring cant and pan/track capability.
 Day optic: An Army specified variable power day optic and compatible rings.
 Back up sights: Iron sights offset 45 deg from the DOS.
 Sling attachment: Flush cup, quick detach sling attachment points.
 Other: The upgraded M110 must meet the operational and environmental requirements that were fulfilled by the original M110 SASS.

M110A1 replacement

In July 2012, the U.S. Army requested sources to remanufacture the current M110 rifle into the Compact Semi-Automatic Sniper System (CSASS). The Army wants a capability to convert 125 rifles per month, with the ability to increase to 325 per month. The Army formally requested proposals for the CSASS in June 2014.

On 1 April 2016, the Army announced it had awarded Heckler and Koch a contract with a maximum value of $44.5 million as winner of the competition to replace the KAC M110. The weapon selected was not specified, but was likely the H&K G28; H&K is to produce 3,643 rifles. A minimum of 30 CSASS units will be used for production qualification testing and operational testing over 24 months. H&K later confirmed that a modified G28 had indeed been selected as the CSASS rifle. The G28 is nearly 6 cm (2.5 in) shorter and 1.3 kg (3 lb) lighter than the M110 (unloaded and without a suppressor) and will cost about $12,000 per rifle. The U.S. Marine Corps was slated to begin receiving the CSASS in May 2018 to replace their M110 rifles. However, as of 2022, most of the M110A1 units delivered were configured as squad designated marksman rifles (SDMR) rather than M110A1 CSASS rifles.

M110A2

The M110A2 is an improved version of the original M110 rifle with M-LOK rails, an improved gas system, new suppressor, and adjustable stock. This fills the gap of semi-automatic sniper rifles as most all of the M110A1 rifles issued were the SMDR variant and not designed for sniper work. The M110A2 was first seen at AUSA 2021 where it was displayed alongside a 14.5" SOCOM M110 rechambered for 6.5 Creedmoor. The M110A2 was later seen at the 2022 Best Ranger Competition being used by a Ranger-qualified 101st Airborne Division soldier. The decreased overall length does not come at the cost of barrel length as the M110A2 still has a  barrel. KAC had a 5 year $13 million contract in 2020 to supply the Army with M110 rifles and this was amended in 2022 to include the M110A2 version of the rifle. The Navy and Marine Corps, which had previously been interested in the M110A1 CSASS, decided to instead pursue an M110 SASS PIP (Product Improvement Program) for FY2021 based on findings indicating improved range and lethality with the PIP compared to the M110A1 CSASS. Funding for subsequent fiscal years has been devoted to this PIP.

M110A3 (6.5mm Creedmoor conversion)
The M110A3 is a 6.5mm Creedmoor conversion for SOCOM M110 rifles. These conversion kits included complete upper receiver assemblies chambered for 6.5 Creedmoor as well as new muzzle brakes, collapsible buttstocks, and precision adjustable buttstocks. New QD suppressors for 6.5 Creedmoor were to be ordered separately.

Users

 : Used by Army Special Forces.
 :Used by Army Special Forces
 : Used by GSOF. 
 : Used by Polish Special Forces.
 
 
 : Used primarily by US Army snipers.

See also
Tabuk Sniper Rifle
Dragunov sniper rifle
PSR-90
SR-25
Barrett M82

References

External links

 M110 Semi-Automatic Sniper System (SASS) Fact sheet Archived
 Knight's Armament Company product page on the SR-25 Series Rifles, includes the M110
 Video demonstration of the M110 from Military Times
 Gun-World.net gallery of the XM110 (Chinese)
 Global Security page on the M110 Archived

7.62×51mm NATO semi-automatic rifles
Sniper rifles of the United States
United States Marine Corps equipment
ArmaLite AR-10 derivatives
Designated marksman rifles
Military equipment introduced in the 2000s